Air Universal was a privately owned airline based in Amman, Jordan, which operated chartered passenger flights between 2002 and 2008. The airline was based at Queen Alia International Airport, Amman, focussing at King Abdulaziz International Airport, Jeddah, Jinnah International Airport, Karachi, Mehrabad International Airport, Tehran and Tripoli International Airport.

Air Universal was registered Jordanian Ministry of Industry and Trade. It held an AOC as commercial operator of scheduled and chartered flights for both passengers and cargo, specializing on operating chartered flights on behalf of other airlines, including aircraft leases. In addition, Air Universal provided maintenance, flight crews, insurance and airline support.

The airline stopped operating its aircraft in 2008.

Fleet
The Air Universal fleet included the following aircraft:

6 Boeing 747-200
2 Lockheed L-1011

References

External links

Official website

Defunct airlines of Jordan
Airlines established in 2002
Airlines disestablished in 2008
Airlines formerly banned in the European Union
2008 disestablishments in Jordan
Jordanian companies established in 2002